Monoplex vespaceus, common name the dwarf hairy triton, is a species of predatory sea snail, a marine gastropod mollusk in the family Cymatiidae.

Distribution
This species has a wide distribution and is found in the Atlantic Ocean (Cape Verde, West Africa, Ghana, Senegal), in the Indian Ocean (Tanzania and Mauritius), in the Indo-West Pacific (New Caledonia), in the Red Sea, in the Gulf of Mexico and in the Caribbean Sea (Lesser Antilles, Belize, Colombia and Cayman Islands).

Description 
The shell size varies between 16 mm and 60 mm.

The maximum recorded shell length is 41 mm.

Habitat 
Minimum recorded depth is 4.5 m. Maximum recorded depth is 4.5 m.

References

Further reading 
 Spry, J.F. (1961). The sea shells of Dar es Salaam: Gastropods. Tanganyika Notes and Records 56
 Rolán E., 2005. Malacological Fauna From The Cape Verde Archipelago. Part 1, Polyplacophora and Gastropoda.
 Rosenberg, G., F. Moretzsohn, and E. F. García. 2009. Gastropoda (Mollusca) of the Gulf of Mexico, Pp. 579–699 in Felder, D.L. and D.K. Camp (eds.), Gulf of Mexico–Origins, Waters, and Biota. Biodiversity. Texas A&M Press, College Station, Texas

External links
 

Cymatiidae
Taxa named by Jean-Baptiste Lamarck
Gastropods described in 1822
Molluscs of the Atlantic Ocean